Edwald (or Edwaldus) was Archbishop of York for a time in the year 971. He resigned the see only months after his election.

Citations

References

 

Archbishops of York
10th-century English archbishops